Bedford Basin is a provincial electoral district in the Canadian province of Nova Scotia that came into effect for the 2021 Nova Scotia general election. It elects one member to the Legislative Assembly of Nova Scotia.

The riding was created by the 2019 provincial redistribution out of parts of Bedford and Waverley-Fall River-Beaver Bank .

The riding contains the neighbourhoods of Oakmount, Bedford Common, Glen Moir, Paper Mill Lake and part of Millview in the community of Bedford, Nova Scotia, part of the Halifax Regional Municipality.

Members of the Legislative Assembly 
This riding has elected the following MLAs:

Election results

2021

2017 redistributed results

References

Nova Scotia provincial electoral districts